St Austell RFC is a Cornish rugby union club that is based in the town of St Austell and was founded in 1963.  The club run three senior men's teams as well as ladies side, a colts and multiple junior/mini sides.  The club's kit is red and white hoops and the first team currently play in Tribute Western Counties West with home games at Tregorrick Park.

History

Early history 

St Austell RFC was formed on 31 July 1963 by Wilf Vernalls and Des Robbins, with home games being played at Cyprus Avenue in Par Moor. There had been a previous rugby club in St Austell called the Hornets who had formed in 1933, but during the 1954–55 season this club relocated to Newquay, becoming known as the Newquay Hornets. The club moved to Circus Field at Cromwell Road in 1967 but would have to wait until the mid 1970s until it emerged as a player on the Cornish senior circuit, defeating established clubs Truro and St Ives in 1976. Several years in 1978 the club reached the final of the Cornwall Cup for the first time, losing 7–6 to Camborne at the Recreation Ground in Redruth. In 1986, St Austell sold their Circus Field ground to Asda spending several seasons without a ground until they moved into their current ground, Tregorrick Park, in 1988.

League rugby 

With the creation of the Courage national leagues in 1987, St Austell were placed in Courage Cornwall/Devon (division 8 of the league system).  They had a poor debut season in the new league, finishing second bottom in 10th place and were relegated to Courage Cornwall League 1.  In 1991 St Austell reached the final of the Cornwall Clubs Cup (the secondary cup in Cornwall at the time) but ended up as losing finalists after a 13–0 defeat to Helston.  After 7 seasons in Cornwall League 1 the club finally achieved promotion in 1995 as they claimed their first ever league title and booked a return to Cornwall/Devon.  Several years later a second league title and promotion was achieved as St Austell won  Western Counties West to reach the dizzy heights of South West 2 West - which at tier 5 is the highest level the club has reached to date.

The 2000–01 season ended up in disappointment for St Austell, as although they were competitive in the division, they were unable to stay up, going down in 10th place just two points behind relegation rivals Ivybridge.  This relegation would see the club fall through the league system as they suffered two more relegations, first from Western Counties West and then from Cornwall/Devon.  St Austell stabilized itself during the 2004–05 season when it bounced back with a league and cup double - winning promotion from Cornwall League 1 as champions and then winning the Cornwall Clubs Cup for the first time in the club's history, defeating Perranporth 11–9 at the final held at St. Clement's Hill in Truro.  Several seasons in Cornwall/Devon ended in relegation in 2007 as the club finished in 10th place after a tough relegation battle, just 2 points off safety.  St Austell then had a period of resurgence as it was promoted from Cornwall League 1 after finishing runners up in 2009.  Two years later another second-place finish, this time in Cornwall/Devon, saw the club promoted to Western Counties West.  In 2012 St Austell reached the final of the Cornwall Cup for the first time in 34 years losing 20–17 to Wadebridge Camels at the Memorial Ground, Penryn.

The 2012–13 season was the most successful season in St Austells history to date.  Firstly the club had an excellent run in the RFU Intermediate Cup (a competition for sides based at level 7 of the league system), beating Wimborne at home 14–8 in February to win the South-West section, making the national semi-finals.  A 31–19 defeat away to Brighton at the beginning of April ended the club's chance of making the final at Twickenham Stadium but they had some compensation as the claimed the Tribute Western Counties West league title with a 38–5 win over Exeter Saracens in front of a club record attendance of 800 at Tregorrick Park.  In 2014 St Austell reached the final of the Cornwall Cup held at the Recreation Ground in Redruth in what was a repeat of the final of 1978, with Camborne once again victorious in a 24–10 win.  The following season St Austell were relegated from Tribute South West 1 West as well as experiencing another disappointment in a Cornwall Cup final, losing to nemesis Camborne, 23-13 after extra time at St Clements Hill, Truro.

On 17 April 2017, St Austell won the Cornwall Cup for the first time in the club's history, in what was their fifth attempt, defeating fellow league side Wadebridge Camels 33–22 at the final held at the Recreation Ground in Redruth in front of a crowd of 850.

Season summary

Honours
Cornwall League 1 champions (2): 1994–95, 2004–05
Cornwall Clubs Cup winners: 2005
Tribute Western Counties West champions (2): 1997–98, 2012–13
RFU South West Intermediate Cup winners: 2013
Cornwall Cup winners: 2017

Notable former players
 Matthew Shepherd - Cornish scrum-half/fly-half who played for St Austell during his early career (scoring over 1,000 points) and who is currently at Plymouth Albion.  He has won the county championship with Cornwall as well as being selected for the England Counties XV.

Notes

See also

 Cornish rugby

References

External links
St Austell RFC
Cornwall RFU

Cornish rugby union teams
English rugby union teams
Rugby clubs established in 1963
Sports clubs in Cornwall
1963 establishments in England
Rugby Football club